Heart Gear (stylized in all caps) is a Japanese manga series written and illustrated by Tsuyoshi Takaki. The series began serialization on Shueisha's Shōnen Jump+ manga website in April 2019, and has been on hiatus since December 2022. As of August 2022, the series' individual chapters have been collected into four volumes.

When creating the series, Takaki decided on using a young girl and robot as protagonists in a post-apocalyptic setting in order to write a science fiction manga that is understandable to a wide audience. Takaki also used the film Android for inspiration in creating the story and various objects from his everyday life and photos of famous places in creating the setting. The series has performed well internationally, especially in France, where its sales have surpassed those of its native country. Critical response has generally been positive, with many critics praising the characters, post-apocalyptic setting, and artwork.

Production
Takaki was fond of the science fiction genre, so after the completion of Black Torch, Takaki wanted to create a science fiction manga. He ultimately chose to make it post-apocalyptic with robots, though he feared that it would be hard for some readers to understand. After discussing this with his editor, he ultimately settled on a young girl and a robot as the main protagonists in order to have two separate viewpoints to write from. When writing the robots in the series, Takaki recalled being fascinated with the human-like robots from the 1982 American film Android, so he used them as a model when writing the series.

Takaki initially had trouble with the setting, as he wanted it to seem futuristic at first sight, but at the same time not become pure fantasy. In order to achieve this, he used things from his daily life like trees, utility poles, and buildings, along with photos on the internet, particularly those of ruins or famous places as a model.

Media

Manga
Written and illustrated by Tsuyoshi Takaki, the series began bi-weekly serialization on Shueisha's Shōnen Jump+ manga website on April 3, 2019. The series' first tankōbon (bound) volume was released on July 4, 2019. In May 2020, the series was put hiatus due to the health of the author. The series returned from its two-year long hiatus in August 2022, before beginning another in December 2022. As of August 2022, the series' individual chapters have been collected into four tankōbon (bound) volumes.

In April 2019, Shueisha began publishing the series in English via their Manga Plus service, with chapters releasing simultaneously with their Japanese release. At New York Comic Con 2022, Viz Media announced that they licensed the series for English publication. The series is also licensed in France by Ki-oon.

Volume list

Other
Chrome, one of the series' main protagonists, is featured in the video game Captain Velvet Meteor: The Jump+ Dimensions.

Reception
The series has sold three times more copies in France than in Japan.

Critical response to the story and characters has generally been positive. Erkael from Manga News liked the setting. He also offered praise for the characters and the way they interact to advance the story. However, Erkael also felt that the story uses too many common elements of shōnen manga. Faustine Lillaz from Planete BD liked the relationship between the human and robot characters and the setting, though she also felt the world building was a bit too subtle. Skeet from Manga Sanctuary enjoyed the emotions of the story, particularly the less-serious parts. However, Skeet also felt the series was a bit generic. Marc Vandermeer from  liked the post-apocalyptic setting, calling it realistic; he also favorably compared several elements of the story to The Girl from the Other Side: Siúil, a Rún. However, he felt the author gave Chrome too much power in the action scenes.

Critical response to the artwork has also been positive. Erkael liked the artstyle, feeling that it helped to make the story feel more immersing and make the action scenes more intense. Skeet liked the variety in pencil strokes used by Takaki, feeling that it made the story feel more impactful. Vandermeer felt the artwork helped to make the story and characters, particularly the robots, feel more captivating and interesting. Though he also felt the artist had trouble drawing some characters' faces.

See also
 Black Torch—Another manga series by the same author

References

External links
  
 Manga Plus page
 

Adventure anime and manga
Japanese webcomics
Post-apocalyptic anime and manga
Shōnen manga
Shueisha manga
Viz Media manga
Webcomics in print